Joseph Levi II (January 31, 1924 – March 31, 2019) was a Republican member of the Pennsylvania House of Representatives.

Biography 
Levi was born in Oil City, Pennsylvania and graduated from Oil City High School. He served in the United States Navy. Levi received his bachelor's degree from Bucknell University. He served on the Oil City Council from 1961 to 1965. Levi also served on the Venango County Commission in 1965. Levi was an oil producer and served as President of Northwest Pennsylvania Regional and Planning Committee in 1973 and 1974.

References

Republican Party members of the Pennsylvania House of Representatives
Pennsylvania city council members
2019 deaths
1924 births
People from Oil City, Pennsylvania
Military personnel from Pennsylvania
Bucknell University alumni
Businesspeople from Pennsylvania
20th-century American businesspeople
United States Navy personnel of World War II

Venango County Commissioners (Pennsylvania)